Jawahar Navodaya Vidyalaya Shopian or JNV Aglar or JNV Shopian is a co-educational residential school in Shopian district of Jammu and Kashmir union territory. The school is affiliated to central board of school education New Delhi with classes from VI to XII standard.
This school category, called as Jawahar Navodaya Vidyalayas are the schools for gifted students predominantly from rural areas, established in every district of India.This is considered one of the best schools in almost every state of India. It is known of its wide range of co-curricular activities.  

The school is run by Navodaya Vidyalaya Samiti, New Delhi, an autonomous organization under the Department of School Education and Literacy, Ministry of Education (MoE) Government of India.

References

Schools in Jammu and Kashmir
Education in Jammu and Kashmir